Charlie Bazzano (10 October 1923 – 9 January 2014) was an Australian cyclist. He competed in the sprint event at the 1948 Summer Olympics. In the 1,000-metre sprint event semi-finals he finished fourth beaten by Britain's Reg Harris, who eventually took the silver medal. He also competed at the 1950 British Empire Games.

In 1971 Bazzano became the NSW cycling coach.

Private life 
Bazzano was born in Morano sul Po in Northern Italy. He had one brother, Leo. They and father Jack arrived in Australia when Charlie was aged three. His nephew Matt Bazzano became a notable cyclist and later Managing Director of Shimano Australia Cycling. Charlie was married to Heather who died several years before him. He used a wheelchair for some years before dying of a heart attack in Cronulla, New South Wales.

References

External links
 
 

1923 births
2014 deaths
Australian male cyclists
Olympic cyclists of Australia
Cyclists at the 1948 Summer Olympics
Sportspeople from the Province of Alessandria
Cyclists at the 1950 British Empire Games
Commonwealth Games competitors for Australia
Cyclists from Piedmont
Italian emigrants to Australia